The 2015 São Tomé (Island or Regional) Second Division was the third season of the fourth-tier competition that took place that season, also being the nation's lowest.  The club was the third and last that hat 12 clubs. Geographically almost all clubs but Porto Alegre and Ribeira Peixe were from the north. Agrosport won the title and participated in the Second Division in the following season, as the number of clubs in the Premier Division  had risen to 12, four clubs qualified alongside Boavista Uba Budo, Sporting São Tomé and Ototó, the Third Division would feature only ten clubs next season. A total of 90 matches were played and 252 goals were scored.

Overview
Sporting São Tomé scored the most goals numbering 30, second was Palmar with 28 and third was Ototó with 26. 6 de Setembro scored the fewest with 10, second fewest was seventh placed Santa Margarida with 16. On the opposites, Andorinha conceded the most with 32, second was Varzim with 31 and third was 6 de Setembro with 26. The fewest goals conceded were Palmar and Sporting São Tomé with 15.

In the following season, four clubs would be promoted as the Third Division would be reduced to 10 teams. Palmar, Boavista Uba Bodo, Sporting São Tomé and Ototó were promoted.

Teams

 Andorinha - finished 10th
 Boavista Uba Budo
 Conde 
 Cruz Vermelha
 Diogo Vaz 
 Otótó
 Santa Margarida - a new club participated in the national competition and the third division for the first time
 Sporting São Tomé    			
 UDESCAI
 Varzim

Division table

Notes

References

Football competitions in São Tomé and Príncipe
Sao Tome
Sao Tome Second Division